The 1983–84 season was Stoke City's 77th season in the Football League and the 51st in the First Division.

Manager Ritchie Barker decided to change his tactics prior to the start of the season which was seen a strange decision as Stoke played well in the previous season playing good football. He change to the long ball style of play and whilst it worked with other sides in the Division it didn't with Stoke and results were poor. Barker was sacked and  his assistant Bill Asprey took over and he brought back club legend Alan Hudson which sparked a revival with a 4–0 win over Wolverhampton Wanderers on the final day of the season seeing Stoke stay up by two points.

Season review

League
It was apparent during the summer of 1983 at a coaching course at Lilleshall that manager Ritchie Barker was converted to the long ball game. In truth it was used by several sides with great success in 1983–84, but not with Stoke. Another youth team product Paul Bracewell was sold to Sunderland for £250,000 and that money was spent on Paul Dyson and Robbie James. Stoke used their new style of play in their pre-season friendlies which drew some interesting results but was quite clear that the players were unhappy at the change and once the season started they struggled desperately out on the pitch. In their first 24 matches they managed just three wins and in deep relegation trouble and it was no surprise to see Barker sacked by the board.

Bill Asprey was put in charge of the team and his task was to get Stoke out of trouble and his first move was to bring back Alan Hudson and sell Mickey Thomas. Hudson inspired a great recovery and Stoke's latter season performances were of a high standard yet the threat of relegation was still there but Stoke's fine efforts saw them take the relegation battle all the way to the final day of the season. Stoke came up against already relegated Wolverhampton Wanderers. It turned out to be an easy game for Stoke as they won 4–0 with Paul Magurie scoring all the goals leaving Stoke safe in 18th place with 50 points two more than Birmingham City.

FA Cup
No progress was made in the FA Cup, Stoke losing 2–0 at home to Everton who would go on to lift the cup.

League Cup
Stoke beat Peterborough United and Huddersfield Town before losing to Sheffield Wednesday in the fourth round.

Final league table

Results

Stoke's score comes first

Legend

Football League First Division

FA Cup

League Cup

Friendlies

FA Youth Cup

Squad statistics

References

Stoke City F.C. seasons
Stoke